Nicholas Davies (born 28 March 1953) is a British investigative journalist, writer, and documentary maker.

Davies has written extensively as a freelancer, as well as for The Guardian and The Observer, and been named Reporter of the Year, Journalist of the Year and Feature Writer of the Year at the British Press Awards.

Davies has made documentaries for ITV's World in Action  and written numerous books on the subject of politics and journalism, including Flat Earth News, which attracted considerable controversy as an exposé of journalistic malpractice in the UK and around the globe. As a reporter for The Guardian, Davies was responsible for uncovering the News of the World phone hacking scandal, including the July 2011 revelations of hacking into the mobile phone voicemail of the murdered schoolgirl Milly Dowler.

Career in journalism
Davies gained a PPE degree from Oxford University in 1974, and started his journalism career in 1976, working as a trainee for the Mirror Group in Plymouth. He then moved to London initially to work for the Sunday People and spent a year working for The Evening Standard before becoming a news reporter at The Guardian in July 1979. Since then he has worked as home affairs correspondent at The Observer; chief feature writer at London Daily News in 1986 and on-screen reporter for World in Action and Channel 4's Dispatches. After the London Daily News folded he moved to the United States for a year, where he wrote White Lies, about the wrongful conviction of a black janitor, Clarence Brandley, for the murder of a white girl. From 1989 Davies was a freelance reporter for The Guardian, for which he contributed articles, working from his home in Sussex. He was the winner of the first Martha Gellhorn Prize for Journalism in 1999. In September 2016 he retired, announcing that he would travel in search of interesting experiences.  His website states he was last seen somewhere between a yoga shala in Indonesia and a cattle ranch in northern Argentina.

Following the publication of Flat Earth News and a Guardian story co-written by Davies claiming that News of the World journalists tapped private mobile phones to get stories, on 14 July 2009 Davies told the Culture, Media and Sport Select Committee that the Metropolitan Police Service had done too little to investigate the claims. The Guardian coverage also led to calls from high-profile MPs for the dismissal of Andy Coulson, communications director for the Conservative Party. Davies received the Paul Foot Award 2011 for his work on this story.

Davies's book on the News International phone hacking scandal, Hack Attack: How the Truth Caught Up with Rupert Murdoch, was released in August 2014.

Critical reaction to Flat Earth News

Flat Earth News was greeted in the London Review of Books on its publication as "a genuinely important book, one which is likely to change, permanently, the way anyone who reads it looks at the British newspaper industry". The LRB highlighted the analysis showing that 60% of the content of UK papers was based mainly on wire copy or press releases, a practice Davies called  "churnalism", while only 12% are original stories and only 12% of stories showed evidence that the central statement had been corroborated. Mary Riddell in The Observer disputed some of the charges against British journalism in the book, and described it as "unduly pessimistic". Peter Oborne in The Spectator concentrated on the use of illegal techniques to invade privacy rather than declining standards, describing Flat Earth News as "hypnotically readable" and praising the collection of evidence that the practice of journalism is "bent", although qualifying this somewhat by suggesting that Davies "ignores a great deal [of journalism] that is salient and good".

Awards
 British Press Awards Reporter of the Year, 2000; Journalist of the Year and Feature Writer of the Year.
 Martha Gellhorn Prize for Journalism, 1999.
 Paul Foot Award 2011, for a series of articles that helped to expose the scale of phone-hacking at the News of the World. (Davies was also nominated for the award the previous year.)

Bibliography

See also
 Metropolitan Police role in the news media phone hacking scandal
 News media phone hacking scandal reference lists
 Clarence Brandley
 Beverley Allitt

References

External links
 Nick Davies official website
 
 Column archive at The Guardian
 Articles authored at Journalisted
 
 Flat Earth News, official book website
 
 An Interview with Nick Davies, The Third Estate, 7 September 2009
 BBC Profile of Nick Davies, BBC Radio 4, 9 July 2011

1953 births
Living people
British investigative journalists
British reporters and correspondents
English male journalists
The Guardian journalists
English non-fiction writers
Alumni of the University of Oxford
English male non-fiction writers
Criticism of journalism